Jorge Filipe Monteiro dos Santos Lourenço (born 15 August 1988), known as Monteiro, is a Portuguese footballer who plays for  AEL Limassol as a winger.

Club career

Portugal
Born in Porto, Monteiro played youth football with local FC Porto, having joined its youth system at the age of 8. Until his release on 30 June 2010, he was consecutively loaned to G.D. Ribeirão, C.F. Estrela da Amadora, S.C. Covilhã (twice) and Portimonense SC.

Monteiro's Primeira Liga input during this timeframe consisted of 13 minutes with the second club, in a 1–0 away loss against Vitória F.C. on 31 August 2008.

Cyprus
In summer 2011, after one season in his country's Segunda Liga with C.D. Santa Clara, Monteiro signed with AEL Limassol from the Cypriot First Division. In his first year, he contributed two goals in 26 games to help his team win the national championship after a 44-year wait.

Monteiro scored a career-best 18 goals in the 2013–14 campaign, topping the goal charts as the side ranked second after eventual winners APOEL FC. During his three-year tenure, he netted 26 times from 105 appearances in all competitions, and also reached the final of the domestic cup twice.

Later years
Monteiro returned to his country and its top flight for 2014–15, joining Moreirense F.C. on a two-year contract. In January 2015, however, he moved back to Cyprus' with AEK Larnaca FC, going on to score ten official goals over a 12-month period.

International career
All youth categories comprised, Monteiro won 30 caps for Portugal and scored five goals. His debut with the under-21s occurred on 11 July 2009, in a 0–1 defeat to Cape Verde for the Lusofonia Games.

Career statistics

Honours
AEL Limassol
Cypriot First Division: 2011–12
Cypriot Cup runner-up: 2011–12, 2012–13

Individual
Cypriot First Division top scorer: 2013–14 (joint)

References

External links

1988 births
Living people
Portuguese footballers
Footballers from Porto
Association football wingers
Primeira Liga players
Liga Portugal 2 players
Segunda Divisão players
FC Porto B players
G.D. Ribeirão players
C.F. Estrela da Amadora players
S.C. Covilhã players
Portimonense S.C. players
C.D. Santa Clara players
Moreirense F.C. players
Anadia F.C. players
S.C. Beira-Mar players
Gondomar S.C. players
Leça F.C. players
Cypriot First Division players
Cypriot Second Division players
AEL Limassol players
AEK Larnaca FC players
Ermis Aradippou FC players
Othellos Athienou F.C. players
Super League Greece players
Iraklis Thessaloniki F.C. players
Portugal youth international footballers
Portugal under-21 international footballers
Portuguese expatriate footballers
Expatriate footballers in Cyprus
Expatriate footballers in Greece
Portuguese expatriate sportspeople in Cyprus
Portuguese expatriate sportspeople in Greece